An election to the Neath Rural District Council in West Glamorgan, Wales was held in May 1955. It was preceded by the 1952 election, and followed by the 1958 election.

Overview of the results
The election resulted in relatively few changes in personnel as Labour comfortably upheld its majority. Around half of the wards saw Labour candidates returned unopposed.

Candidates
The profile of candidates was similar to three years previously with a number of long-serving Labour councillors returned unopposed.

Outcome
Labour maintained in full control of the authority, gaining an additional three seats at the expense of the Independents. One of these was the seat at Crynant, lost at a by-election the previous year following the death of John James.

Ward results

Baglan Higher (one seat)

Blaengwrach (one seats)

Blaenrhonddan, Bryncoch Ward (one seat)

Blaenrhonddan, Cadoxton Ward (one seat)

Blaenrhonddan, Cilfrew Ward (one seat)

Clyne (one seats)

Coedffranc (five seats)

Dyffryn Clydach (two seats)

Dulais Higher, Crynant Ward (one seat)

Dulais Higher, Onllwyn Ward (one seat)

Dulais Higher, Seven Sisters Ward (two seats)

Dulais Lower (one seat)

Michaelstone Higher (one seat)

Neath Higher (three seats)

Neath Lower (one seat)

Resolven, Cwmgwrach Ward (one seat)

Resolven, Resolven Ward (two seats)

Resolven, Rhigos Ward (two seats)

Resolven, Tonna Ward (one seat)

References

1955 Welsh local elections